Montague Higgs (27 January 1939 – 14 November 2006) was a Bahamian sailor. He competed at the 1972 Summer Olympics and the 1984 Summer Olympics.

References

External links
 

1939 births
2006 deaths
Bahamian male sailors (sport)
Olympic sailors of the Bahamas
Sailors at the 1972 Summer Olympics – Star
Sailors at the 1984 Summer Olympics – Star
Place of birth missing